The 1940 Baylor Bears football team represented Baylor University in the Southwest Conference (SWC) during the 1940 college football season. In their 15th and final season under head coach Morley Jennings, the Bears compiled a 4–6 record (0–6 against conference opponents), finished in last place in the conference, and were outscored by opponents by a combined total of 114 to 109. They played their home games at Waco Stadium in Waco, Texas. Robert C. Nelson and Milton S. Merka were the team captains.

Schedule

References

Baylor
Baylor Bears football seasons
Baylor Bears football